Rajjumala is a 2004 Sri Lankan Sinhala mystery, thriller film directed by Anura Chandrasiri and produced by Chithrani Hidurangala. It stars Bandu Samarasinghe and Dilhani Ekanayake in lead roles along with Suvineetha Weerasinghe, and Roshan Pilapitiya. Music composed by Nalaka Anjana Kumara. This is the first dramatic role played by Bandu Samarasinghe. It is the 1042nd Sri Lankan film in the Sinhala cinema. Amarasiri Peiris won the Sarasavi Award for the Best Singer in 2004. Shooting of the film was complete in and around the locations in Pelmadulla, Wadduwa and Panadura areas.

Plot

Cast
 Bandu Samarasinghe as Sekara
 Dilhani Ekanayake as Punya
 Suvineetha Weerasinghe
 Roshan Pilapitiya
 Nirosha Herath
 G.R Perera
 Kumara Jayakantha

Soundtrack

References

2004 films
2000s Sinhala-language films